The National Hockey League Game of the Week is a branding used for regular season National Hockey League weekend games that are typically televised on a national broadcast network in the U.S.

The branding was previously used by NBC on Sunday afternoons, beginning at the weekend of the NFL Conference Championship games when it held NHL broadcast rights between the 2005–06 and 2020–21 seasons. During the 2016–17, NBC began to promote the Star Sunday brand on both the Game of the Week and its Sunday Night Hockey broadcasts on sister cable network NBCSN, focusing primarily on the NHL's star players. Star Sunday featured extensive pre-game, in-game and post-game coverage of each featured player. The first game under the new package featured the New York Rangers and the Detroit Red Wings on January 22, 2017, with Ryan McDonagh and Dylan Larkin the featured players of their respective teams.

Beginning with the 2021-22 season, ABC replaced NBC as the league's network broadcast partner. Since then, ABC has typically aired one game per weekend, usually on Saturday afternoons, beginning in February. Due to the current arrangement of ABC's sports programming being produced and co-branded by ESPN, the broadcasts carry the NHL on ESPN production and branding.

History

Schedules

2000s

2006–07 season

2007–08 season
Starting this season, NBC aired these Game of the Week games on a national basis, in addition to carrying the national broadcasts of the Winter Classic on New Year's Day and the Stanley Cup Playoffs during the Spring.

2008–09 season

2010s

2009–10 season

2010–11 season

2011–12 season
The Pittsburgh Penguins had an overall five network TV appearances during this season, making it the first NHL team in Pennsylvania and the first NHL team to have overall five network appearances in a regular season.

2012–13 season

2013–14 season

2014–15 season

2015–16 season
 NBC was supposed to air the Pittsburgh-Washington match-up on January 24, but however, the game was postponed due to hazardous weather, so the network instead selecting St. Louis-Chicago game as their match-up and it aired in the Primetime slot.

2016–17 season

During the season, NBC's Star Sunday concept was added to the Game of the Week package. The first game under the new brand took place on January 22, 2017, in a game between the New York Rangers and the Detroit Red Wings.

(*) Designated as a Star Sunday game.

2017–18 season
During this season, the Philadelphia Flyers had an overall five network TV appearances, making it the final NHL team in Pennsylvania and the second NHL team to have overall five network appearances (the first was Pittsburgh Penguins in 2011–12 season). NBC initially announced that no NHL games would be aired on the network during the 2018 Winter Olympics, however they changed course and added three Sunday afternoon games in February as a lead-in to the Winter Olympics, allowing Mike Emrick and Eddie Olczyk to stay home and call 3 NHL games. NBC correctly switched the final minutes of the 2018 NHL Stadium Series to its sister network NBCSN (except for viewers in the Washington D.C. market) at 11 p.m. eastern time after play stoppage due to the power outage delay. Star Sunday returned on March 11, 2018, both as part of the Game of the Week and Sunday Night Hockey package.

(*) Designated as a Star Sunday game.

2018–19 season
 For the first time, NBC selected two regional games which to aired it in primetime on February 2, 2019. Star Sunday returned on February 3, 2019, both as part of the Game of the Week and Sunday Night Hockey package. This marked the first and only season of Star Sunday to have its presenting sponsor; AT&T was the first presenting sponsor and they branded themselves as Star Sunday presented by AT&T.

(*) Designated as a Star Sunday game.

2020s

2019–20 season
For this season only, Brian Boucher replaced Pierre McGuire on the lead broadcast team with Mike Emrick and Eddie Olczyk. McGuire would be reassigned to work with NBC's other broadcast teams. The Pittsburgh Penguins originally had six network television appearances during that season (for the first time since the 2011–12 season), however, due to the cancellation of their final two network TV appearances (the Washington-Pittsburgh match-up on March 22 and the Pittsburgh-Philadelphia match-up on March 29) because of the coronavirus pandemic, they reduced to four as the games are postponed due to the pandemic, in which the rest of the regular season was paused indefinitely due to the pandemic. All players and hockey staff were asked to self-quarantine in their home cities until further notice. On May 26, 2020, Gary Bettman, the NHL commissioner, was announced that the rest of the regular season was cancelled.

2020–21 season
Due to the COVID-19 pandemic, the start of the 2020–21 NHL season has been delayed to January 13, 2021, and all teams would play a 56-game division-only schedule with the NHL temporarily realigning divisions to minimize travel as much as possible, with all seven Canadian teams playing one division due to COVID-19 cross-border travel restrictions imposed by the Government of Canada.

NBC Sports broadcast 16 NHL regular season games, which is the most ever NHL regular season games broadcast on NBC. The NHL on NBC schedule featured a number of rivalries, including the Capitals–Penguins rivalry, the Blackhawks–Red Wings rivalry, the Bruins-Rangers rivalry, and the Avalanche-Blues rivalry. Meanwhile, the Washington Capitals had five network television appearances this season, the third NHL team to have largest appearances during the regular season. The final NHL on NBC game was on May 8, 2021, with two games aired regionally, all but New York metro and Boston markets, who got the Penguins-Sabres game, got the Bruins-Rangers rivalry game, and the regional games were shared with the teams' respective broadcasters in their aforementioned markets. It also marked as the final season for the games to aired on NBC after 16 years, as 10 games were regained by over-the-air ABC beginning next season.

2021–22 season (ABC)

2022–23 season
All on ABC
Source:
 February 11, 2023
 1 p.m., Tampa Bay Lightning vs. Dallas Stars
 3:30 p.m., Washington Capitals vs. Boston Bruins
 February 18, 2023, 8 p.m., Washington Capitals vs. Carolina Hurricanes (2023 NHL Stadium Series)
 February 25, 2023
 1 p.m., New York Rangers vs. Washington Capitals
 3:30 p.m., Pittsburgh Penguins vs. St. Louis Blues
 March 4, 2023
 1 p.m., New York Rangers vs. Boston Bruins
 3:30 p.m., Colorado Avalanche vs. Dallas Stars
 March 11, 2023
 1 p.m., Detroit Red Wings vs. Boston Bruins
 3:30 p.m., Philadelphia Flyers vs. Pittsburgh Penguins
 March 18, 2023, 8 p.m., Pittsburgh Penguins vs. New York Rangers
 March 25, 2023, 8 p.m., Washington Capitals vs. Pittsburgh Penguins
 April 1, 2023, 3 p.m., Boston Bruins vs. Pittsburgh Penguins
 April 8, 2023
 1 p.m., Pittsburgh Penguins vs. Detroit Red Wings
 3:30 p.m., Vegas Golden Knights vs. Dallas Stars
 8 p.m., New Jersey Devils vs. Boston Bruins

Notes

References

2006 American television series debuts
2021 American television series endings
2000s American television series
2010s American television series
2020s American television series
Game of the Week
NBC
NBC original programming